Election Day in Russia was 18 September 2016. Among them were the legislative election for the 7th State Duma, nine gubernatorial elections, 39 regional parliamentary elections, and many elections on the municipal and local level.

State Duma

All 450 seats of the State Duma were up for re-election on 18 September.

Gubernatorial elections

Republic of Komi
Tula Oblast
Zabaykalsky Krai
Tver Oblast
Republic of Chechnya
Ulyanovsk Oblast
Republic of Tuva
Republic of North Ossetia
Republic of Karachay Cherkessia

Regional legislative elections

Republic of Adygea
Republic of Dagestan
Republic of Ingushetia
Republic of Karelia
Republic of Mordovia
Republic of Chechnya
Republic of Chuvashia
Altai Krai
Kamchatka Krai
Krasnoyarsk Krai
Perm Krai
Primorsky Krai
Stavropol Krai
Amur Oblast
Astrakhan Oblast
Vologda Oblast
Kaliningrad Oblast
Kirov Oblast
Kursk Oblast
Leningrad Oblast
Lipetsk Oblast
Moscow Oblast
Murmansk Oblast
Nizhny Novgorod Oblast
Novgorod Oblast
Omsk Oblast
Orenburg Oblast
Oryol Oblast
Pskov Oblast
Samara Oblast
Sverdlovsk Oblast
Tambov Oblast
Tver Oblast
Tomsk Oblast
Tyumen Oblast
Saint Petersburg
Jewish Autonomous Oblast
Khanty-Mansi Autonomous Okrug
Chukotka Autonomous Okrug

Mayoral elections in regional capitals
Kemerovo

Local self-government elections in regional capitals
Ufa
Nalchik
Petrozavodsk
Saransk
Grozny
Perm
Stavropol
Kaliningrad
Kemerovo
Saratov
Khanty-Mansiysk

Other local elections
On election day in 2016 there were more than five thousand other elections of heads of municipalities and for local municipal councils of deputies in cities across the country, along with 148 local referendums.

Notes

2016 elections in Russia
Regional elections in Russia